Flat Lake is the name of various lakes and places:

Flat Lake (Nova Scotia) (section Lakes)
Flat Lake (British Columbia) in Flat Lake Provincial Park, British Columbia, Canada
Flat Lake (South Dakota)
Riggs Flat Lake
Scotts Flat Reservoir (redirect from Scotts Flat Lake)
Pine Flat Lake, Nevada

Places
Flat Lake, Alberta

Other
Flat Lake Festival